The Ambassador of the United Kingdom to Slovenia is the United Kingdom's foremost diplomatic representative in Slovenia, in charge of the UK's diplomatic mission.  The official title is His Britannic Majesty's Ambassador to the Republic of Slovenia. The embassy is located in the TR3 building at Republic Square, Ljubljana.

Slovenia split from Yugoslavia in June 1991. The members of the European Union recognised Slovenia as an independent state on 15 January 1992 and member countries, including the UK, then appointed ambassadors.

Ambassadors to Slovenia
1992–1997: Gordon Johnston OBE
1997–2000: David Lloyd OBE
2001–2005: Hugh Mortimer LVO
2005–2009: Timothy Simmons
2009–2013: Andrew Page
2014–2015: Christopher Yvon (chargé d'affaires)

2015–: Sophie Honey

References

External links
UK and Slovenia, gov.uk

Slovenia
 
United Kingdom